Shari (Dargwa: Шири) is a rural locality (a selo) in Uraginsky Selsoviet, Dakhadayevsky District, Republic of Dagestan, Russia. The population was 80 as of 2010. There are 2 streets.

Geography 
It is located 12 km southwest of Urkarakh.

Nationalities 
Dargins live there.

References 

Rural localities in Dakhadayevsky District